Big Sugar is the eponymous debut album by Canadian rock band Big Sugar, released 1992 on Hypnotic Records.

Critical reception
AllMusic wrote that "Gordie Johnson himself pens the discs two highlights: both 'Groundhog Day' and 'Goodbye Train' feature funky, lurching rhythms and muscular guitar work that offer just the right blend of originality and familiarity."

Track listing
 "Sleep in Late" (Dave Wall, Andrew Whiteman)
 "Come Back Baby" (B.B. Arnold)
 "Motherless Children" (traditional)
 "So Many Roads" (Marshall Paul)
 "Bemsha Swing" (Denzil Best, Thelonious Monk)
 "Stardust" (Hoagy Carmichael, Mitchell Parish)
 "Groundhog Day" (Gordie Johnson)
 "Just About Sunrise" (Johnson)
 "Goodbye Train" (Johnson)
 "Nowhere to Go" (Colin Linden)
 "'Round Midnight" (Bernie Hanighen, Monk, Cootie Williams)
 "Devil Got My Woman" (Skip James)

References

1992 debut albums
Big Sugar albums